Richard Caldwell or Caldwall M.D., FRCP (1505?–1584) was an English physician, known for his part in founding the Lumleian Lectures, an annual series of anatomical demonstrations, delivered by the College of Physicians.

Works
One of Caldwell's works was published, after his death. It was a translation of some Tables of Surgerie, from a Latin work by Horatius Morus of Florence, based on the writings of Jean Tagault. The book had both English and Latin text. Edward Caldwell, son or nephew, presented 500 copies to the College of Physicians.

Notes

Attribution

1505 births
1584 deaths
16th-century English medical doctors
Fellows of Brasenose College, Oxford
Presidents of the Royal College of Physicians